Edílson Mendes Guimarães (born 27 July 1986 in Nova Esperança), most commonly known as Edílson, is a Brazilian professional footballer who plays as a right back for Grêmio.

He made his debut for Grêmio on 3 March 2010, against Avenida. The final score was 3–1 for Grêmio and Edílson made a goal and an assistance during the match. On 12 July 2011, he joined Atlético Paranaense on a one-and-half-year loan deal at the request of head coach Renato Gaúcho.

Career statistics

Honours
Vitória
Campeonato Baiano: 2005

Botafogo
Taça Rio: 2013
Taça Guanabara: 2013
Campeonato Carioca: 2013

Corinthians
Campeonato Brasileiro Série A: 2015

Grêmio
Copa do Brasil: 2016
Copa Libertadores: 2017
Recopa Gaúcha: 2022

Cruzeiro
Copa do Brasil: 2018
Campeonato Mineiro: 2018, 2019

Avaí
Campeonato Catarinense: 2021

References

1986 births
Living people
Association football defenders
Brazilian footballers
Avaí FC players
Esporte Clube Vitória players
Clube Atlético Mineiro players
Associação Atlética Ponte Preta players
Grêmio Foot-Ball Porto Alegrense players
Joinville Esporte Clube players
Grêmio Esportivo Juventus players
Club Athletico Paranaense players
Botafogo de Futebol e Regatas players
Copa Libertadores-winning players
Sport Club Corinthians Paulista players
Campeonato Brasileiro Série A players
Campeonato Brasileiro Série B players